Hülya Cömert (born January 8, 1980) is a Turkish volleyball player.

Sporting achievements

Clubs 
CEV Champions League:
  1999
Turkish Championship:
  1999, 2000
  2003
CEV Cup:
  2000

References

External links
 Women.Volleybox profile
 CEV profile

1980 births
Living people
Turkish women's volleyball players
Sportspeople from Ankara